The Hawkes Children's Library in West Point, Georgia was built in 1922. It is one of the Hawkes Children's Library buildings inspired and funded with support from Albert King Hawkes. The building is a work of architectural and engineering firm Robert & Co. and was constructed by Batson & Cook.  It includes Colonial Revival and Georgian Revival architecture.  The library was listed on the National Register of Historic Places in 1990.

The library is located along the Chattahoochee River in West Point. It contains historical information for Troup County, Georgia and Chambers County, Alabama. The library also hosts educational and arts programs.

See also
National Register of Historic Places listings in Troup County, Georgia

References

Libraries on the National Register of Historic Places in Georgia (U.S. state)
Colonial Revival architecture in Georgia (U.S. state)
Library buildings completed in 1922
Buildings and structures in Troup County, Georgia
National Register of Historic Places in Troup County, Georgia
Children's libraries